The 2011–12 National League 2 North was the third season (twenty-fifth overall) of the fourth tier (north) of the English domestic rugby union competitions since the professionalised format of the second division was introduced.  The league system was 4 points for a win, 2 points for a draw and additional bonus points being awarded for scoring 4 or more tries and/or losing within 7 points of the victorious team. In terms of promotion the league champions would go straight up into National League 1 while the runners up would have a one-game playoff against the runners up from National League 2 South (at the home ground of the club with the superior league record) for the final promotion place.

After two years of missing out on promotion via the playoffs, Loughborough Students went one better and won the league title outright, being easily the best side in the division and finishing 22 points clear of the rest of the pack to gain promotion to the 2012–13 National League 1.  While Loughborough Students were clear winners the battle for second place was much tighter with Caldy eventually taking the runners up place just 1 point ahead of Preston Grasshoppers and Hull.  Caldy's luck would run out in the promotion playoff, however, losing 20 - 13 away to 2011–12 National League 2 South runners up Richmond.  Apart from Kendal who were the first team to go down, it was very tightly contested at the bottom of the table as with bonus points paying a huge role in determining Nuneaton's relegation, with the Nun's 10 victories being supplanted with just 6 bonus points.  The final side to go down was Harrogate who finished 1 point adrift of 13th placed Leicester Lions, with more wins than the Leicestershire side but not enough bonus points.  Kendal and Harrogate would drop to National League 3 North while Nuneaton would fall to National League 3 Midlands.

Participating teams and locations

Twelve of the teams listed below participated in the 2010–11 National League 2 North season; Otley were relegated from the 2010–11 National League 1, Bromsgrove (champions) and Sheffield Tigers (playoffs) would come up from National League 3 Midlands while Stockport were promoted as champions of National League 3 North.

Final league table

Results

Round 1

Round 2

Round 3

Round 4

Round 5

Round 6

Round 7

Round 8

Round 9

Round 10

Round 11

Round 12

Round 13

Round 14

Round 15

Round 16

Round 17

Round 18

Round 19 

Postponed.  Game rescheduled to 4 February 2012.

Postponed.  Game rescheduled to 4 February 2012.

Postponed.  Game rescheduled to 4 February 2012.

Round 20

Round 21

Round 19 (rescheduled games) 

Initially rescheduled from 14 January 2012 but postponed again.  Game rescheduled to 25 February 2012.

Initially rescheduled from 14 January 2012 but postponed again.  Game rescheduled to 25 February 2012.

Initially rescheduled from 4 February 2012 but postponed again.  Game rescheduled to 25 February 2012.

Round 22 

Postponed.  Game rescheduled to 25 February 2012.

Postponed.  Game rescheduled to ?.

Postponed.  Game rescheduled to ?.

Postponed.  Game rescheduled to ?.

Postponed.  Game rescheduled to ?.

Postponed.  Game rescheduled to ?.

Postponed.  Game rescheduled to 25 February 2012.

Round 23

Rounds 19 & 22 (rescheduled games) 

Game rescheduled from 4 February 2012.

Game rescheduled from 11 February 2012.

Game rescheduled from 11 February 2012.

Game rescheduled from 4 February 2012.

Game rescheduled from 4 February 2012.

Round 24

Round 25

Round 22 (rescheduled games) 

Game rescheduled from 11 February 2012.

Game rescheduled from 11 February 2012.

Game rescheduled from 11 February 2012.

Game rescheduled from 11 February 2012.

Game rescheduled from 11 February 2012.

Round 26

Round 27

Round 28

Round 29

Round 30

Promotion play-off
Each season, the runners-up in the National League 2 North and National League 2 South participate in a play-off for promotion into National League 1.  Richmond were runners-up in the South and would host the game as they had a better record in the league in comparison to the North runners up Caldy.

Total season attendances

Individual statistics 

 Note that points scorers includes tries as well as conversions, penalties and drop goals.

Top points scorers

Top try scorers

Season records

Team
Largest home win — 85 pts
90 - 5  Preston Grasshoppers at home to Otley on 14 April 2012
Largest away win — 40 pts
50 - 10  Loughborough Students away to Nuneaton on 3 December 2011
Most points scored — 90 pts (x2)
90 - 5  Preston Grasshoppers at home to Otley on 14 April 2012
90 - 20  Luctonians at home to Kendal on 28 April 2012
Most tries in a match — 14 (x2)
Preston Grasshoppers at home to Otley on 14 April 2012
Luctonians at home to Kendal on 28 April 2012
Most conversions in a match — 10 (x3)
Preston Grasshoppers at home to Otley on 14 April 2012
Bromsgrove at home to Westoe on 21 April 2012
Luctonians at home to Kendal on 28 April 2012
Most penalties in a match — 6 (x2)
Preston Grasshoppers away to Sheffield Tigers on 8 October 2011
Harrogate at home to Leicester Lions on 28 April 2012
Most drop goals in a match — 2 
Nuneaton at home to Caldy on 27 August 2011

Player
Most points in a match — 35
 Dominic Moon for Preston Grasshoppers at home to Otley on 14 April 2012
Most tries in a match — 7
 Dominic Moon for Preston Grasshoppers at home to Otley on 14 April 2012
Most conversions in a match — 10 (x2)
 Nathan Fowles for Preston Grasshoppers at home to Otley on 14 April 2012
 Ben Copson for Bromsgrove at home to Westoe on 21 April 2012
Most penalties in a match — 6 (x2)
 Graham Holroyd for Preston Grasshoppers away to Sheffield Tigers on 8 October 2011
 Jack Latus for Harrogate at home to Leicester Lions on 28 April 2012
Most drop goals in a match — 2 
 Lee Chapman for Nuneaton at home to Caldy on 27 August 2011

Attendances
Highest — 1,214
Loughborough Students at home to Nuneaton on 20 April 2012
Lowest — 100 (x7)
Loughborough Students at home to Huddersfield on 24 September 2011
Leicester Lions at home to Otley on 8 October 2011
Leicester Lions at home to Kendal on 5 November 2011
Leicester Lions at home to Westoe on 26 November 2011
Leicester Lions at home to Hull Ionians on 21 January 2012
Leicester Lions at home to Caldy on 3 March 2012
Leicester Lions at home to Huddersfield on 17 March 2012
Highest Average Attendance — 430
Luctonians
Lowest Average Attendance — 129
Leicester Lions

See also
 English Rugby Union Leagues
 English rugby union system
 Rugby union in England

References

External links
 NCA Rugby

2011-12
2011–12 in English rugby union leagues